Malgbe is an Afro-Asiatic language spoken in northern Cameroon and southwestern Chad.  Dialects are Douguia, Dro, Malgbe, Mara, and Walia.

Malgbe is spoken in Goulfey commune and also to the south in Chari (Logone-et-Chari department, Far North region). It is related to Afade, Mser, Lagwan, Maslam, and Mpade. Malgbe is also spoken in Chad. The total population is estimated at 36,000 speakers.

Notes 

Biu-Mandara languages
Languages of Chad
Languages of Cameroon